Robert Kirkman (born November 30, 1978) is an American comic book writer,  screenwriter and television producer. He is best known for co-creating The Walking Dead, Fear the Walking Dead, Invincible, Tech Jacket, Outcast, Oblivion Song and Fire Power for Image Comics, in addition to writing Ultimate X-Men, Irredeemable Ant-Man and Marvel Zombies for Marvel Comics. He has also collaborated with Image Comics co-founder Todd McFarlane on the series Haunt. 

He is one of the five partners of Image Comics, and the only one of the five who was not one of its co-founders.

In 2010, Kirkman founded entertainment company Skybound Entertainment in order to develop properties in traditional and new media, including comics, television, and film. The company also manages the license for Walking Dead and Invincible. In 2018, Skybound expanded to create Skybound Games to develop video games based on its intellectual property.

Kirkman is also known for creating and producing the television series Outcast and Invincible, both adaptations of his own comic book series. He has also written a number of episodes for The Walking Dead and Fear the Walking Dead.

Early life
Kirkman was born November 30, 1978, in Lexington, Kentucky, and was raised in Cynthiana, Kentucky.

Kirkman was a fan of zombie films such as the Night of the Living Dead series and Zombi 2 as well as zombie video games such as Resident Evil.

Career
His first comic book work was the 2000 superhero parody Battle Pope, which he co-created with artist Tony Moore, self-published under the Funk-O-Tron label, and was adapted into a season of 8 animated webisodes that appeared on Spike TV's website in 2008. Later, while pitching a new series, Science Dog, Kirkman and artist Cory Walker were hired to do a SuperPatriot miniseries for Image Comics. While working on that book, Kirkman and E. J. Su created the 2002 Image series Tech Jacket, which ran six issues, and the one-shot title, Cloudfall.

In 2003, Kirkman and Walker created Invincible for Image's new superhero line. The story surrounded the adolescent son of the world's most powerful superhero, who develops powers and starts his own superhero career. Walker later failed to meet the monthly title's deadlines and was replaced by Ryan Ottley. In 2005, Paramount Pictures announced it had bought the rights to produce an Invincible feature film, and hired Kirkman to write the screenplay. However, due to a lack of significant development, the rights expired and reverted to Kirkman.

Shortly after the launch of Invincible, Kirkman and Moore began The Walking Dead (2003). Kirkman said in 2012 that Image had balked at publishing a comics series featuring what it felt was simply another zombie story, prompting him to say the zombies were part of an alien plot—a notion he had no intention of using except as a means of selling the project. Artist Charlie Adlard replaced Tony Moore with issue #7. Moore continued to draw covers until issue 24 as well as the first four volumes of the trade paperbacks for the series.

In 2003, Kirkman was hired by Marvel Comics to pen a revival of the 1990s Sleepwalker series, but it was canceled before being published; the contents of its first issue were included in Epic Anthology No. 1 (2004).  He soon became a mainstay at Marvel, writing the "Avengers Disassembled" issues of Captain America vol. 4, 2004's Marvel Knights 2099 one-shots event, Jubilee #1–6 and Fantastic Four: Foes #1–6, a two-year run on Ultimate X-Men and the entire Marvel Team-Up vol. 3 and the Irredeemable Ant-Man miniseries. He continued his exploration of zombies by creating the series Marvel Zombies, in which an alternative Marvel universe's superheroes become zombies.

At Image, Kirkman and artist Jason Howard created the ongoing series The Astounding Wolf-Man, launching it on May 5, 2007, as part of Free Comic Book Day. Kirkman edited the monthly series Brit, based on the character he created for the series of one-shots, illustrated by Moore and Cliff Rathburn. It ran 12 issues.

Kirkman announced in 2007 that he and artist Rob Liefeld would team on a revival of Killraven for Marvel Comics. Kirkman that year also said he and Todd McFarlane would collaborate on Haunt for Image Comics.

In late July 2008, Kirkman was made a partner at Image Comics, thereby ending his freelance association with Marvel. Nonetheless, later in 2009, he and Walker produced the five-issue miniseries The Destroyer vol. 4 for Marvel's MAX imprint.

In 2009, Kirkman and Marc Silvestri took over the 2009–2010 Pilot Season for Top Cow Comics. The 2009/2010 Pilot Season contains a series of five one-shot pilot comics that readers will be able to vote on which becomes an ongoing series. Each series is co-created by Silvestri who also provides cover art.

In 2010, he also began producing the television adaption of his comic book series The Walking Dead, the pilot of which was directed by Frank Darabont. Kirkman has written or co-written seven episodes of the series. Kirkman also created and serves as an executive producer on the show's companion series, Fear the Walking Dead.

In July 2010, Kirkman announced he would launch and run a new Image Comics imprint called Skybound Entertainment.

On February 9, 2012, Tony Moore filed a lawsuit alleging that Kirkman, in 2005, had deceitfully engineered him into surrendering his rights to The Walking Dead comic book and eventual TV series in exchange for payments that never materialized. Kirkman said in a statement the following day that he and Moore "each had legal representation seven years ago and now he is violating the same contract he initiated and approved and he wants to misrepresent the fees he was paid and continues to be paid for the work he was hired to do." Kirkman in turn sued Moore. On September 24, 2012, the two released a joint statement saying they had reached a settlement "to everyone's mutual satisfaction."

Kirkman made an appearance in a 2012 episode of Adult Swim's Robot Chicken as himself where he tries to tell The Nerd and Daniel a hint, but gets eaten by the zombies.

In November 2013, Cinemax purchased a TV pilot based on Kirkman and artist Paul Azaceta's then-upcoming six-issue exorcism comics miniseries, Outcast. The first issue of the comic was released in June 2014 to positive reviews.

Kirkman was a producer of the science fiction thriller Air, which starred The Walking Deads Norman Reedus, and Djimon Hounsou. The movie was released in 2015. It was the first feature film to be produced by Skybound Entertainment.

Kirkman's latest television project known as Five Year will be a joint venture between Skybound and Viki.com.  It will be filmed for TV in Korea and available everywhere on Viki.com. The pre-apocalyptic story centres on a family dealing with an impending meteor strike.  It was picked up for an initial 1 season run of 16 episodes with a plan for 5 seasons. Filming begins in late 2016.

Around November 7, 2016, Kirkman's production company Skybound Entertainment was set to produce a remake of the film An American Werewolf in London. The remake was to be written and directed by Max Landis, son of the original director John Landis. Kirkman and David Alpert would be executive producers on the film. However, after the sexual misconduct allegations against Landis, it is currently unknown if it is still happening.

On April 4, 2017, it was announced that Seth Rogen and Evan Goldberg would direct/write/produce a live-action adaptation of Invincible for Universal Pictures, with Kirkman also serving as a producer on the project. In 2021, Kirkman reaffirmed that the project was still in the works.

In 2018, it was announced that Amazon Prime Video had given a series order for an animated adaptation of Invincible for a first season consisting of eight episodes. Simon Racioppa serves as showrunner for the series and also serves as executive producer alongside Kirkman, David Alpert, Catherine Winder, Seth Rogan, and Evan Goldberg. The series stars Steven Yeun, J. K. Simmons, Sandra Oh, Mark Hamill, Seth Rogen, Gillian Jacobs, Andrew Rannells, Zazie Beetz, Walton Goggins, Jason Mantzoukas, Zachary Quinto, Khary Payton, Chris Diamantopoulos, Malese Jow, Kevin Michael Richardson and Grey Griffin. In April 2021, the series was renewed for a second and third season.

Kirkman pitched the story for Renfield, a horror-comedy about Count Dracula's henchman Renfield. The film was announced by Universal Pictures in November 2019. It is directed by Chris McKay and stars Nicholas Hoult and Nicolas Cage as Renfield and Dracula, respectively.

Personal life
Kirkman and his wife live in Kentucky. Their son, Peter Parker Kirkman, was born on April 25, 2006.

Accolades

In 2020, he was granted a special award ("Fauve d'honneur") at the Angoulême International Comics Festival for his overall achievement.

Bibliography

 Battle Pope #1–13 (2000–2002)
 Invincible #1–144 (2003–2018)
 The Walking Dead #1–193 (2003–2019)
 Marvel Zombies #1–5 and Marvel Zombies 2 #1–5 (2006–2008)
 The Irredeemable Ant-Man #1–12 (2006–2007)
 Image United #1–3 (2009–2010)
 Outcast by Kirkman and Azaceta #1–48 (2014–2021)
 Oblivion Song by Kirkman and De Felici #1–36 (2018–2022)
 Fire Power #1–Ongoing (2020–Present)

Filmography

The Walking Dead
Kirkman has written a number of The Walking Dead TV episodes.

 1.04 – "Vatos"
 2.01 – "What Lies Ahead" (co-written with Ardeth Bey)
 2.13 – "Beside the Dying Fire" (co-written with Glen Mazzara)
 3.08 – "Made to Suffer"
 4.03 – "Isolation"
 4.09 – "After"
 5.02 – "Strangers"

Fear the Walking Dead
Fear the Walking Dead is a companion series to The Walking Dead, set in Los Angeles, California and starting prior to the apocalypse. Robert Kirkman is co-creator of the series alongside Dave Erickson. He is also an executive producer and has co-written episodes of the series.

 1.01 – "Pilot" (co-written with Dave Erickson)
 1.06 – "The Good Man" (co-written with Dave Erickson)

Outcast
Outcast is a horror series on Cinemax.

 1.01 – "A Darkness Surrounds Him" 
 1.04 – "A Wrath Unseen"

Invincible 
Invincible is an animated adaptation of the comic of the same name. Kirkman, in addition to serving as an executive producer, wrote the season premiere and the finale.

 1.01 – "It's About Time"
 1.08 – "Where I Really Come From"

References

External links

1978 births
Living people
American comics writers
The Walking Dead (franchise)
, Kirkman
Image Comics
Marvel Comics people
Marvel Comics writers
Skybound Entertainment
American television producers
American television writers
American male television writers
People from Richmond, Kentucky
Screenwriters from Kentucky
21st-century American male writers
Inkpot Award winners